Ripak-e Abdok (also Romanized as Rīpak-e ʿAbdok) is a village in Negur Rural District, Dashtiari District, Chabahar County, Sistan and Baluchestan Province, Iran. At the 2006 census, its population was 357, in 68 families.

References 

Populated places in Chabahar County